Communist Party for Independence and Socialism (PCLS;  in Martinican Creole, PKLS is a communist and pro-independence  political party in Martinique. In 1984 an important faction of the Martinican Communist Party advocating the independence of Martinique broke away and founded the PKLS on May 22, 1984.

The party defines itself as a Marxist-Leninist party. It boycotts the political institutions and does not take part in elections.

It publishes the monthly "Patriyote".

External links

Foro de São Paulo
Political parties established in 1984
Political parties in Martinique